Cerberolebeda is a monotypic moth genus in the family Lasiocampidae described by Vadim V. Zolotuhin in 1995. Its single species, Cerberolebeda styx, described by the same author in the same year, is found in eastern India, Myanmar, northern Thailand, northern Laos, northern Vietnam and Hainan, China.

External links

Lasiocampidae
Monotypic moth genera